Serifa is a slab serif typeface family created by Adrian Frutiger in 1967. The typeface is based on the Univers family.

Usage
It was most prominently featured in the logo of Montgomery Ward from 1982 to 1992 and again in the revived online store. It was also used in the campaign ads for Ross Perot's 1992 Presidential campaign and from 1982 to late 1987 on the graphics of various CBS News programming, and for the local news programs at the CBS owned-and-operated television stations (as well as several affiliates).
In 2014 Jake Tilson used it in the NT signage to complement the NT logo.
Serifa is also used in nearly all of the College Board's communications and exams.

References 

Typefaces and fonts introduced in 1964
Typefaces designed by Adrian Frutiger
Serif typefaces
Slab serif typefaces